The Progressive Constitutionalist Party (PCP) was a political party in Malta between 1953 and 1971.

History
The PCP was established in 1953 by Mabel Strickland, owner of the Times of Malta and daughter of Gerald Strickland, the founder of the Constitutional Party. It was a split from the Constitutional Party, which Strickland had left in protest against its support for the Labour Party's policy of integration with the United Kingdom.

The party failed to win a seat in elections in 1953 and 1955, but won a single seat in the 1962 elections. However, it lost its seat in the post-independence 1966 elections. After failing to win a seat in the 1971 elections it subsequently disappeared.

Ideology
The party promoted loyalty to the Catholic church and the British Crown, but advocated dominion status for Malta to avoid any cultural assimilation or secularisation that integration with the United Kingdom would bring. It also held a strict anti-communist line.

References

External links
Progressive Constitutional Party's Principles and Programme

Defunct political parties in Malta
Political parties established in 1953
1953 establishments in Malta
Political parties disestablished in 1971
1971 disestablishments in Malta
Anti-communist parties
Catholic political parties
Monarchist parties